Oceanpayment is an online payment service provider with headquarters in Hong Kong. Lanny Yang is the incumbent chief executive officer of the company.

The company was founded in 2014. As a payment service provider, Oceanpayment provides payment solutions to merchants globally in businesses such as online games, travel, and e-commerce. It accepts payments in more than five hundred payment methods from small to large-scale enterprises with availability in more than two hundred countries.

History 
The company was established in May 2014 by Lanny Yang and has branches and offices in Shenzhen, Singapore, Australia, Americas, and Europe. It consists of a group of experts with the background in the payment industry with headquarters in Hong Kong.

In 2015, it was certified as a service provider for Visa and MasterCard.

In 2016, it received Hong Kong License for Operating Money Service.

In 2017, it became a certified acquirer for AMEX.

In 2018, it became a principal acquiring member of Union Pay International (UPI). In the same year, it also became the first partner of Shopify in China.

In 2019, it became a member of the Hong Kong General Chamber of Commerce, along with being the principal acquirer for JCB and Discover Global Network.

In 2020, the company received the IFTA Fintech Achievement Award and became a Google Pay and Apple Pay payment service provider.

In 2021, it received awards such as HKMOB Awards, The Most Trusted Global Payment Service Provider of the Year, IFTA Fintech Achievement Award, and became CIO Advisor APAC in category Top Ten Payment Solution Providers in Asia Pacific. In the same year,  it also partnered with Watsons.

Services 
 Card payments
 Alternative payments 
 WeChat Pay
 Alipay 
 Omnichannel payments
 Risk management
 Payment gateway

Certifications 
 PCI DSS (Level 1)
 Payment Service Provider for Visa and Mastercard
 Acquirer for Discover, AMEX, JCB, and UnionPay International
 PSPs of Apple and Google Pay

References 

Financial services companies of Hong Kong
Companies of Hong Kong